Helou, Hélou or Helu is a surname that means "sweet" or "pretty" in Arabic. Notable people with the surname include:

Abdul Latif Helou (born 1971), Syrian footballer
Anissa Helou (born 1952), British food writer of Lebanese/Syrian descent
Carlos Slim Helu (born 1940), Mexican business magnate of Lebanese descent
Charles Helou (1913–2001), President of Lebanon
Henri Helou, Lebanese politician and Member of Parliament
John Helou (died 1823), Lebanese religious leader
Nina Helou (1904–1989), Lebanese lawyer and First Lady